Celtis julianae, the Julian hackberry, is a species of flowering plant in the family Cannabaceae, native to central and southern China. It is a fast-growing deciduous tree with gray bark reaching .

It has found use as a street tree in a number of Chinese and French cities, and is commercially available in Europe and North America, but not in the United Kingdom.

References

julianae
Trees of China
Endemic flora of China
Flora of North-Central China
Flora of South-Central China
Flora of Southeast China
Plants described in 1916